Rethinakottai  is a village in the Aranthangirevenue block of Pudukkottai district, Tamil Nadu, India.

Demographics 

As per the 2001 census, Rethinakottai had a total population of 2583 with 1238 males and 1345 females. Out of the total population 1719 people were literate.

References

Villages in Pudukkottai district